Griselda Records is an American hip hop independent record label based in Buffalo, New York. It was founded by rapper Westside Gunn, his brother Conway the Machine, and Mach-Hommy in 2012. In addition to the founding members, Benny the Butcher and in-house producer Daringer make up the flagship artists of the Griselda Records roster.

The Griselda namesake also refers to a loose-knit hip hop collective composed of the core signees of the label. The collective's de facto leader is the label's founder Westside Gunn. To date, Griselda has two releases as a collective: the extended play Don't Get Scared Now in 2016 and debut album WWCD in 2019. The record label draws its name from notorious drug lord Griselda Blanco.

Beginning in the label's formative years, physical copies of the label's music were distributed in limited releases by London label Daupe! that often sold out within minutes. In 2017, Griselda signed a distribution deal with Shady Records for artists Westside Gunn and Conway. In 2019, Westside Gunn and Benny the Butcher signed a management deal with Roc Nation.

Artists

Current acts 
 Westside Gunn
 Benny the Butcher
 Mach-Hommy
 Armani Caesar
 Boldy James
 Rome Streetz
 Stove God Cooks
 Jay Worthy
 YN Billy

In-house producers 
 Daringer
 Conductor Williams
 Camouflage Monk
 Denny LaFlare

Former acts 
 Conway the Machine
 Elcamino

Discography

Studio albums

Soundtrack albums

EPs

Mixtapes

Awards and nominations

References

American record labels
American hip hop record labels
Record labels established in 2014
Hardcore hip hop record labels
American independent record labels
Hip hop collectives
Companies based in Buffalo, New York